Electric monopole, or object with non-zero divergency of electrical field may refer to:
 Electric charge

See also
 Magnetic monopole (non-zero divergency of magnetic field)